Sumner Hill may refer to:
Sumner Hill, California
Sumner Hill Historic District, in Boston, Massachusetts